This is a list of publications by English author James Essinger. For information about the author see main article James Essinger.

Books and Publications by James Essinger

Historical

Management and consultancy

Financial

Computing and technology

Co-authored publications

Other articles

Lists of publications